Durango is an unincorporated community in western Falls County, Texas, United States. It lies along Farm to Market Road 935.

References

Unincorporated communities in Falls County, Texas
Unincorporated communities in Texas